Cotting School is a private, non-profit school for children with special needs located in Lexington, Massachusetts, United States. It was founded in 1893 as the nation's first school for children with disabilities. Cotting's preschool, lower, middle, and upper schools offer academic instruction focusing on a variety of skills and content areas, vocational assessment, and training.  Therapies are integrated into classroom instruction as much as possible, and the staff fosters student independence at all times.  A Family Support Coordinator works as an advocate for parents. Monthly Parent Advisory Committee meetings and the Cotting Family Community encourage active parent involvement, which promotes communication between families and the School.  HOPEhouse is a transitional 5-day residential program opening in 2013 for up to ten young people ages 18–22 with physical and/or learning challenges who will benefit from social, educational, and vocational training.

History
Cotting School was founded in 1893 and was America's first day school for children with physical disabilities.
From its founding until its merger with the Krebs School in 1986, Cotting School was located at 241 St. Botolph Street in Boston Massachusetts. The school was founded by Drs. Edward H. Bradford and Augustus Thorndike, both orthopedic surgeons at Children's Hospital Boston and was originally called The Industrial School for Crippled and Deformed Children. The school was also known as the Industrial School for Crippled Children and Cotting School for Handicapped Children.

Cotting School, A Pictorial History was written by David Manzo and Elizabeth Campbell Peters and published by Arcadia Publishing (April 2, 2008).

Services
The school offers the following services: special education, assistive technology, art, music, library/media, dental, vision, nursing, occupational therapy, physical therapy, speech therapy, industrial arts, tutorial services, pre-vocational and vocational training. Cotting School is accredited by the New England Association of Schools and Colleges (NEASC) and has full approval status from the Massachusetts Department of Elementary and Secondary Education.

Affiliations
AccesSportAmerica
Association of Independent Schools of New England
Best Buddies of Massachusetts
Boston College
Boston University's Sargent College of Health and Rehabilitation Sciences
Children's Hospital Boston
Children's League of Massachusetts
Emerson College Clinical Training Program
International Association of Special Education
Massachusetts Association of 766-Approved Private Schools
Massachusetts Council of Human Service Providers
Massachusetts Special Olympics
New England Handicapped Sports Association (NEHSA)
New England College of Optometry
Northeastern University's Bouve College of Health Sciences
Perkins School for the Blind
Regis College
Salem State College
Tufts University School of Dental Medicine
Wheelock College

Resources

Cotting School website

References

Special schools in the United States
Educational institutions established in 1893
Buildings and structures in Lexington, Massachusetts
Schools in Middlesex County, Massachusetts
Private high schools in Massachusetts
Private middle schools in Massachusetts
Private elementary schools in Massachusetts
1893 establishments in Massachusetts